The Bethany Swedes football program (historically known as the "Terrible Swedes") is a college football team that represents Bethany College in the Kansas Collegiate Athletic Conference, a part of the NAIA.  The team has had 17 head coaches on record since its first recorded football game in 1893.

The current head coach is Curran White who took over for the 2019 season.  White replaced Paul Hubbard who took the position after the conclusion of the 2014 season and the departure of Manny Matsakis.  Matsakis was hired in March 2013 to replace Jamie Cruce who first took the position for the 2006 season and resigned after completion of the 2012 season.

The two most successful coaches in terms of winning percentage are Bennie Owen and Ted Kessinger, both who have been inducted into the College Football Hall of Fame.

Key

Coaches
Statistics correct as of the end of the 2019 college football season.

See also

 List of Kansas Collegiate Athletic Conference people
 List of people from McPherson County, Kansas

Notes

References

Lists of college football head coaches

Kansas sports-related lists